Spencer Creek is a stream in St. Charles County in the U.S. state of Missouri. It is a tributary of Dardenne Creek.

Spencer Creek has the name of George Spencer, a local judge.

See also
List of rivers of Missouri

References

Rivers of St. Charles County, Missouri
Rivers of Missouri